Data literacy is the ability to read, understand, create, and communicate data as information. Much like literacy as a general concept, data literacy focuses on the competencies involved in working with data. It is, however, not similar to the ability to read text since it requires certain skills involving reading and understanding data.

Background 
As data collection and data sharing become routine and data analysis and big data become common ideas in the news, business, government  and society, it becomes more and more important for students, citizens, and readers to have some data literacy. The concept is associated with data science, which is concerned with data analysis, usually through automated means, and the interpretation and application of the results.

Data literacy is distinguished from statistical literacy since it involves understanding what data means, including the ability to read graphs and charts as well as draw conclusions from data. Statistical literacy, on the other hand, refers to the "ability to read and interpret summary statistics in everyday media" such as graphs, tables, statements, surveys, and studies.

Role of libraries and librarians
As guides for finding and using information, librarians lead workshops on data literacy for students and researchers, and also work on developing their own data literacy skills.

A set of core competencies and contents that can be used as an adaptable common framework of reference in library instructional programs across institutions and disciplines has been proposed.  

Resources created by librarians include MIT's Data Management and Publishing tutorial, the EDINA Research Data Management Training (MANTRA), the University of Edinburgh's Data Library and the University of Minnesota libraries’ Data Management Course for Structural Engineers.

See also
 Information literacies
 Information literacy
 Media literacy
 Numeracy
 Statistical literacy
 Transliteracy

References 

Computer literacy
Mathematics education
Big data